HD 175535 is a binary star system in the northern circumpolar constellation of Draco. It has an apparent visual magnitude of 4.92, which is bright enough to be faintly visible to the naked eye. It is moving further from the Earth with a heliocentric radial velocity of +8.5 km/s.

The binary nature of this system was announced by W. W. Campbell of the Lick Observatory in 1911.

It is 320 million years old with 3.27 times the mass of the Sun and about 13 times the Sun's radius. The star is radiating 219 times the Sun's luminosity from its enlarged photosphere at an effective temperature of 5,024 K.

References

G-type giants
Spectroscopic binaries
Draco (constellation)
Durchmusterung objects
175535
092689
7137